The Burmese–Siamese War (1759–1760) was the first military conflict between the Konbaung dynasty of Burma (Myanmar) and the Ban Phlu Luang Dynasty of the Ayutthaya Kingdom of Siam. It reignited the centuries-long conflict between the two Southeast Asian states that would last for another century. The Burmese were "on the brink of victory" when they suddenly withdrew from their siege of Ayutthaya because their king Alaungpaya had fallen ill. He died three weeks later, ending the war.

The casus belli were over the control of the Tenasserim coast and its trade, and the Siamese support for ethnic Mon rebels of the fallen Restored Hanthawaddy Kingdom. The newly founded Konbaung Dynasty had wanted to reestablish Burmese authority in the upper Tenasserim coast (present-day Mon State) where the Siamese had provided support to the Mon rebels and deployed their troops. The Siamese had refused Burmese demands to hand over the Mon leaders or to stop their intrusions into what the Burmese considered their territory.

The war began in December 1759 when 40,000 Burmese troops led by Alaungpaya and his son Hsinbyushin invaded down the Tenasserim coast from Martaban. Their battle plan was to go around the heavily defended Siamese positions along shorter, more direct invasion routes. The invasion force overran relatively thin Siamese defenses in the coast, crossed the Tenasserim Hills to the shore of the Gulf of Siam, and turned north towards Ayutthaya. Taken by surprise, the Siamese scrambled to meet the Burmese in their south, and put up spirited defensive stands en route to Ayutthaya. But battle-hardened Burmese forces overcame numerically superior Siamese defenses and reached the outskirts of Siamese capital on 11 April 1760. But only five days into the siege, the Burmese king suddenly fell ill and the Burmese command decided to withdraw. An effective rearguard operation by General Minkhaung Nawrahta allowed for an orderly withdrawal.

The war was inconclusive. While the Burmese regained control of the upper coast down to the Tavoy, they had not eliminated the threat to their hold on the peripheral regions, which remained tenuous. They were forced to deal with Siamese-supported ethnic rebellions in the coast (1762, 1764) as well as in Lan Na (1761–1763). The Burmese would launch their next invasion in 1765, and topple the three-centuries-old Ayutthaya Kingdom in 1767.

Background

Tenasserim coast to 1740
The control of Tenasserim coast (present-day Mon State and Tanintharyi Region in Myanmar) in the early 18th century was divided between Burma and Siam, with the Burmese controlling down to Tavoy (Dawei) and the Siamese controlling the rest. Throughout history, both kingdoms had claimed the entire coast (the Siamese to Martaban, and the Burmese to Junkceylon), and control had changed hands several times. The Burmese Pagan Dynasty controlled the entire coast until 1287. Throughout 14th and 16th centuries, Siamese kingdoms (first Sukhothai, later Ayutthaya) controlled much of the coast, up to just south of present-day Mawlamyaing. In the mid-16th century, the Burmese under Toungoo kings Tabinshwehti and Bayinnaung tried to regain the coast, first failing in 1548, and finally succeeding in 1564 when they conquered all of Siam for the first time. The Siamese revolted in 1584, and under their king Naresuan regained the lower coast by 1593 and the entire coast by 1594. The Burmese retook the upper coast down to Tavoy in 1615, but failed to recover the rest.

This arrangement lasted until 1740 (although the Siamese unsuccessfully tried to take the upper coast in 1662–65). During this period, Mergui on the Andaman Sea was the primary port of Siam through which its trade with India and the West was conducted.

Burmese civil war (1740–57)

In 1740, the Mons of Lower Burma revolted against the Toungoo Dynasty and founded the Restored Hanthawaddy Kingdom based in Pegu. Throughout the 1740s, the Hanthawaddy forces were winning against Upper Burma-based Toungoo armies. The Siamese were concerned by another rising power in Burma since a strong Burma historically meant future invasions to Siam. After all, it was then Pegu-based Toungoo Dynasty in the 16th century that turned to Siam after having first conquered Upper Burma. Concerned, the Siamese court readily gave protection to the Burmese governors of Martaban and Tavoy who had fled to Siam. In 1745, they sent a diplomatic mission to Ava (Inwa) to evaluate the political situation there, and were received by the Burmese king Mahadhammaraza Dipadi. They saw an Ava court that was on its last legs. By 1751, Restored Hanthawaddy forces were closing in on Ava. The Siamese concerns about the emergence of another strong dynasty based in Pegu appeared imminent.

Perhaps as a precautionary measure, the Siamese decided to move their forward base into the upper coast in 1751. Or it could have been an opportunistic land-grab while Restored Hanthawaddy armies were deeply involved in Upper Burma. While it remains unclear as to whether the Siamese ever intended or possessed the military capability to go beyond the coast into mainland Lower Burma, the Siamese action nonetheless rang alarm bells in Pegu. Deeply concerned, the Hanthawaddy leadership withdrew two-thirds of their army back down to Lower Burma immediately after they had toppled the last Toungoo king in April 1752.

This redeployment of Hanthawaddy troops proved a critical turning point in Burmese history as it gave nascent Upper Burmese resistance groups much needed breathing room. The Hanthawaddy command left less than 10,000 men to pacify all of Upper Burma. Historians call the redeployment premature, pointing out that the Siamese threat was never as grave as any counterforce that could rise from Upper Burma, the traditional home of political power in Burma. Taking advantage of light Hanthawaddy troops, one resistance group, the Konbaung Dynasty led by Alaungpaya, drove out Hanthawaddy troops from Upper Burma by May 1754. Konbaung armies invaded Lower Burma in 1755, and captured Pegu in 1757, ending the 17-year-old Mon kingdom.

Siamese policy change and support of Mon resistance
For the Siamese, the situation they had feared—the emergence of a strong power in Burma—had come true although it was the Upper Burma-based Konbaung Dynasty, not Restored Hanthawaddy they were originally concerned about (ironically, the Siamese were partly responsible for the initial success of Konbaung Dynasty as their occupation of the upper coast helped divert the main body of Hanthawaddy troops southward). In a policy switch, they now actively supported Mon resistance groups still operating in the upper coast where Burmese control was still nominal.

After the Konbaung sack of Pegu in 1757, the governors of Martaban and Tavoy had sent in tribute to Alaungpaya to avoid the same fate (the Tavoy governor turned out to be paying dual tribute, and would be executed later). While the Burmese now claimed the upper Tenasserim coast down to Tavoy,  their hold of Lower Burma was still tenuous and especially in the southernmost Tenasserim coast it was largely nominal. Indeed, once Konbaung armies returned north in 1758 for their expeditions in Manipur and northern Shan States, the Mons of Lower Burma rose in rebellion.

The rebellion initially was successful, driving out the Burmese governor from Pegu. It was eventually put down by local Konbaung garrisons. Mon resistance leaders and their followers fled to the Siamese controlled Tenasserim coast and remained active there. The border became the scene of chronic raiding and counter-raiding.

Casus belli
Alaungpaya was concerned by the continuing flow of Mon rebels to the Siamese controlled territories, believing that the Mons would always be plotting to rebel and win back Lower Burma(his concern proved justified. The Mons put up several rebellions in 1758, 1762, 1774, 1783, 1792, and 1824–1826. Each failed rebellion was followed by more Mon flight to Siam). Alaungpaya demanded that the Siamese stop their support of the Mon rebels, surrender their leaders, and cease intrusions into the upper coast, which he considered Burmese territory. The Siamese king Ekkathat refused Burmese demands, instead prepared for war.

While historians generally agree that the Siamese support of the Mon rebels and their cross border raids were some of the causes of war, they do not agree on (other) ulterior motives. Some British colonial era historians of Burmese history (Arthur Phayre, G.E. Harvey) outright downplay the aforementioned reasons as "pretexts", and have suggested that the primary cause of the war was Alaungpaya's desire to restore Bayinnaung's empire (which included Siam). David Wyatt, a historian of Thai history, acknowledges that Alaungpaya could have feared "Ayutthaya's backing for the revival of the Kingdom of Pegu" but adds that Alaungpaya, "apparently a rather crude country fellow with scant experience of statecraft was simply continuing to do what he early demonstrated he could do best: lead armies to warfare".

But Burmese historian Htin Aung strongly counters that their analyses greatly understate Alaungpaya's genuine concern for his still nascent and unstable rule in Lower Burma, and that Alaungpaya never invaded Arakan as the Arakanese never showed him any hostility, although Sandoway in southern Arakan had sent him tribute in 1755. Historian Thant Myint-U also points out the Siamese longstanding policy of keeping "a buffer against their aged-old enemies the Burmese" has extended down to the modern era where families of insurgent Burmese leaders are allowed to live in Thailand, and insurgent armies are free to buy arms, ammunition, and other supplies.

Later Western historians provide a somewhat more balanced view. D.G.E. Hall writes that the "chronic raiding" by the Siamese and Mon rebels "alone would have provided an adequate casus belli" although he adds "for a monarch unable to settle down to a peaceable existence". David I. Steinberg, et al., concur that the casus belli grew out of a local rebellion in Tavoy in which the Siamese were thought to be involved. More recently, Helen James states that Alaungpaya likely wanted to capture Siam's trans-peninsula trade, while granting that his "subsidiary motivation" was to stop Siamese attacks and Siamese support for the Mons.

Prelude to war

Siamese battle plan
In 1758, at the death of King Borommakot, Ayutthaya was the wealthiest city in mainland Southeast Asia. After a brief succession struggle, one of Borommakot's sons, Ekkathat, emerged as king after another son Uthumphon gave up the throne to become a monk. As king, Ekkathat faced the developing situation in the west left behind by his father. He refused Alaungpaya's demands, and prepared for war.

The Siamese battle plan was a defensive one. Ekkathat improved the defenses of Ayutthaya and took up prepared positions all along the routes that the previous Burmese invasions had followed. The main Siamese forces were massed to the westward approaches of Ayutthaya (previous Burmese invasions had always come via the Three Pagodas Pass in the west, and sometimes also by Chiang Mai in the north). Ekkathat's Ayutthaya defenses included a small number of Dutch-manned warships, as well as several cannon-mounted war-boats manned by foreigners ("feringhis and Mahomedans"). To guard the coast and the Gulf of Siam flank, he deployed two smaller armies, totaling 20 regiments (27,000 men, 1,300 cavalry and 500 elephants). Of the total, only 7,000 infantrymen and 300 cavalry were deployed in the Tenasserim coast itself.

Ekkathat asked his old rival and brother Uthumphon to leave the monkhood, and made him the commander-in-chief.

Burmese battle plan
The Burmese too had begun to assemble their invasion force, starting during their new year celebrations in April 1759, gathering troops from all over Upper Burma, including from recently conquered northern Shan States and Manipur. By late 1759, Alaungpaya had massed a force of 40 regiments (40,000 men including 3,000 cavalry) at Yangon. Of the 3,000 cavalry, 2,000 were Manipuri "Cassay Horse", who had just been press-ganged into Alaungpaya's service after the Burmese conquest of Manipur in 1758.

The Burmese battle plan was to go around the heavily defended Siamese positions along the Three Pagodas Pass-Ayutthaya corridor. They selected a longer but less defended route: Go south to Tenasserim, cross the Tenasserim Hills over to Gulf of Siam, and turn north to Ayutthaya. To that end, the Burmese had assembled a fleet of 300 ships to transport a portion of their troops directly to the Tenasserim coast.

Alaungpaya was to lead the invasion personally, and his second son Hsinbyushin was his second-in-command. His first son Naungdawgyi was left to administer the country (two of his other sons,  a 14-year-old Bodawpaya and a 16-year-old Amyint Mintha were to lead a small battalion each). Also in his service were his top generals including the likes of Minkhaung Nawrahta who like all Burmese leadership had plenty of military experience. Some in the court urged him to stay behind and allow Hsinbyushin to lead the operation but the king refused.

First clashes of war
According to the Burmese chronicles, the first clashes of war occurred towards the end of the monsoon season in the Tavoy frontier. On 20 September 1759 (15th waning of Tawthalin 1121 ME), Alaungpaya was informed of Siamese attacks on Burmese shipping around Tavoy and continued Siamese intrusions into the Tavoy frontier. To be sure, it could very well be Burmese justification but it could also be that the Siamese were already enforcing their forward perimeter even by then.

Tenasserim Coast campaign

Capture of Tavoy 
On 21 December 1759 (3rd waxing of Pyatho 1121 ME), Alaungpaya and his invasion army, numbering 46,000 infantrymen and 3,500 cavalry left Yangon for Martaban at the frontier. At Martaban, instead of taking the usual route via the Three Pagodas Pass, the Burmese invaded south, with Hsinbyushin leading the vanguard of six regiments (5,000 men, 500 horses) to Tavoy. Tavoy was easily occupied, and its hapless governor, who was torn between two greater powers and paying dual tribute, was executed. The Burmese army paused for three days for the rest of army to arrive by land and by sea.

Capture of Mergui 
After the rest of the Burmese army had arrived, Alaungpaya's army marched and besieged Mergui. The vastly outnumbered Siamese garrison of 7,000 infantrymen and 300 cavalry was easily overran by the Burmese army. In less than two weeks of the war, the Burmese had captured both Mergui and the town of Tenasserim, and controlled the entire Tennaserim coast.

Gulf of Siam campaign

Capture of Kui Buri 
Knowing that the main Siamese armies would be moving to their south to meet his armies, Alaungpaya did not pause. The Burmese troops quickly moved eastward, crossed over the Tenasserim Hills, and reached present-day Prachuap Khiri Khan Province on the shore of the Gulf of Siam. The southern flank was defended by a Siamese army of 20,000 infantrymen, 1,000 cavalry and 200 elephants, in addition to the 7,000-strong Siamese army that retreated from Tenasserim. Likewise, because of the minimal Siamese resistance in the coast, the 40,000-strong Burmese army was still largely intact although the invasion army was hemmed in the narrow strip of coastline by the Gulf of Siam. The Siamese defenses met the invading force outside Kui Buri but were defeated and forced to retreat.

Capture of Pranburi 
After defeating the Siamese army at Kui Buri, the Burmese marched 40 km and faced another army at Pranburi. The Burmese won the battle and took the city. After capturing Pranburi, the Burmese encountered much stiffer Siamese resistance.

Siamese reinforcements 
Seeing the success of the Burmese invasion, Ekkathat reinforced the front with a land and naval force consisting of 60,000 men with 4,000 guns. The guns in the land force were mounted on carriages and elephants while those in the naval force were placed on war boats. Over the next two months (February and March 1760), battle-hardened Burmese forces overcame several spirited Siamese stands, and took Phetchaburi and Ratchaburi.

Mainland Siam campaign

Battle of Suphan Buri 
By capturing Ratchaburi, the Burmese had now fought their way out of the narrow Kra Isthmus and made it to mainland Siam by late March 1760 (early Tagu 1121 ME). As the Burmese forces marched towards Ayutthaya, a Siamese force of 30,000 infantrymen and 3,000 cavalry was sent to halt the Burmese army from crossing the Tha Chin River in Suphan Buri. The Burmese launched a three pronged attack (led by Hsinbyushin in the center flanked by generals Minkhaung Nawrahta and Minhla Thiri) on heavily fortified Siamese positions around the city. The Burmese took heavy losses but ultimately prevailed, taking five senior Siamese commanders and their war elephants.

Siege of Ayutthaya (1760)

Despite heavy losses at Suphan Buri, the Burmese army had to march on towards Ayutthaya. They could not rest since the monsoon season was a little over a month away. As Ayutthaya was surrounded by several rivers, laying siege in the rainy season would have been a daunting task. The whole country would be under several feet of water. Half of the remaining Burmese forces were down with dysentery and Alaungpaya himself was not well.

Nevertheless, the Burmese arrived at the environs of Ayutthaya on 11 April 1760. The Siamese sent a new 15,000-strong army to meet the invaders. But the force, which was probably made up of fresh conscripts, was promptly defeated by the battle-hardened Burmese army, though no longer in full strength. To avoid a long siege, the Burmese king sent envoys into the city, calling upon the Siamese king to surrender, promising that he would not be dethroned. Ekkathat sent envoys of his own to negotiate but found Alaungpaya's terms unacceptable, and negotiations broke down completely. Starting on 14 April, during the Burmese and Siamese new year's celebrations, the Burmese began bombarding the city itself for the next three days.

But the Burmese king's health deteriorated rapidly. He was suffering from either dysentery or scrofula. According to the Siamese sources, he was wounded by the bursting of a shell from a battery whose installation he was personally supervising but the Burmese sources definitely state that he became ill with dysentery. There was no reason for the Burmese chronicles to hide the truth since it is more glorious for a Burmese king to die of wounds received on the battlefield than to die of a common ailment. Moreover, if he had been wounded in the full view of the army, it would have been known to the whole army, creating confusion.

Rearguard
The Burmese command kept Alaungpaya's serious illness a secret and ordered a general withdrawal, giving the excuse that the king was indisposed. The king selected the friend of his childhood, Minkhaung Nawrahta, for the signal honor of commanding the rearguard. These were the "pick of the army"—500 cavalry and 6,000 infantrymen, every man of whom had a musket. Minkhaung Nawrahta spread them out and waited. It was two days before the Siamese realized that the main Burmese army had left. The full Siamese force then came out. His men watched the ring closing round them, and fearing to be cut off, pleaded the general to let them fight further back. But he said "Friends, the safety of our Lord the King lies in our keeping. Let us not fight further back lest the sounds of guns break his further sleep." With his leadership, the Burmese forces withdrew in good order, collecting army stragglers along the way.

Death of Alaungpaya and end of war
Alaungpaya died on 11 May 1760 near Martaban, after being rushed by the advance guard. With his death, the war ended.

Aftermath
After Alaungpaya's death, the new Burmese king Naungdawgyi was embroiled in several rebellions, including that of Minkhaung Nawrahta, and could not resume the war.

The war was inconclusive. For all their work, the Burmese gained little of their original objectives. Siam very much remained a thorn to the stability of Burmese peripheral regions. In the following years, Siam continued to provide support to Mon rebels in the south who raised a major rebellion in 1762 as well as those in Lan Na in the north (1761–63). The only lasting territorial gain the Burmese achieved was the upper Tenasserim coast, on which they previously had only a nominal claim (the Siamese retook the lower coast up to Mergui in 1761). Although the Siamese troops no longer openly intruded the border, the Mon rebels continued to operate from the Siamese territory. In 1764, the Mon governor of Tavoy, who was made governor by Alaungpaya only four years earlier, revolted until it was put down in November 1764. Likewise, the instabilities in Lan Na resumed soon after the Burmese army left in February 1764, forcing the army to return again later in the year. The inconclusive nature of the war would lead to the next war in 1765.

Analysis
The Burmese success in getting to Ayutthaya is generally attributed to their strategy of going around the established Siamese defenses along the traditional invasion routes. But it is not clear it was the main reason for their success. While the Burmese made the right decision to first attack a lightly defended Tenasserim coast (only 7,000 troops), once they had crossed over to the side of Gulf of Siam, they faced increasingly stiff Siamese resistance. Though the Siamese were initially surprised by the Burmese attack route, they readjusted, and shifted their main forces south. In fact, the latter battles by the Gulf of Siam were costly for the invasion force. The Burmese chronicles report that the Burmese took substantial losses just to break out of the narrow isthmus although they also report that the Siamese also lost more men and ammunition (indeed, the Burmese found the geography of the narrow isthmus so unfavorable to the attacking force that they would revert to attacking Ayutthaya through more direct routes in their next invasion in 1765).

A more likely reason for Burmese success could be that the Burmese, who had been fighting successive wars since 1740, were much more battle-hardened. Their military leaders were all "self-made military men", all of whom had substantial military experience under their belt. On the other hand, it is not clear how much military experience the Siamese leaders or their soldiers had since Siam had been at peace for a long time. The Siamese king had to ask his brother to disrobe to lead the war. The lack of military experience of the Siamese command, probably explains why the Siamese defenses despite having geographic defensive advantages and numerical superiority still lost to a smaller, partial-strength Burmese army along the Gulf of Siam, as well as at Suphanburi and outside Ayutthaya. Likewise, without good leadership, the use of foreign mercenaries did not appear to have made a noticeable difference (the Burmese burned ships manned by foreign mercenaries).

History shows that leadership mattered when most soldiers on both sides were conscripts. The same Siamese conscripts under more capable leaders in another ten years would prove as formidable as any in mainland Southeast Asia, and go on to redress their "historical military inferiority to Burma".

Significance
The war marked the resumption of warfare between the two kingdoms that had been dormant since 1665. The inconclusive nature of this war would lead to more wars that would go on until 1854. From a geopolitical standpoint, Burma now had a firmer, though still by no means complete, hold on the upper Tenasserim coast. Still, the southward shift of the line of control was strategically important. The Burmese would launch their next invasion from Tavoy in 1765 and not Martaban as was the case in 1759.

Notes

References
 
 
 
 
 
 
 
 
 
 
 
 
 
 
 

1700s in Asia
1750s in Asia
1760s in Asia
1759 in Asia
1760 in Asia
1759 in the Ayutthaya Kingdom
1760 in the Ayutthaya Kingdom
1750s in the Ayutthaya Kingdom
1760s in the Ayutthaya Kingdom
18th century in Burma
18th century in the Ayutthaya Kingdom
Burmese–Siamese wars
Wars involving the Ayutthaya Kingdom
Conflicts in 1759
Conflicts in 1760